National road 50 is a route belonging to the Polish national road network. The highway forms a part of bypass of Warsaw metropolitan area, running from 29 to 84 km away from centre of Warsaw. The route has two bridges over Vistula, one in Wyszogród and another in Góra Kalwaria.

Because of the heavy traffic (road is used as a detour for trucks due to restrictions in Warsaw), the highway was completely reconstructed and has a few bypasses along major and smaller towns.

Major cities and towns along the route 
 Ciechanów (road 60)
 Płońsk (expressway S7, road 10) – bypass
 Wyszogród (road 62)
 Sochaczew (road 92) – bypass
 Żyrardów – bypass
 Mszczonów (expressway S8)
 Grójec (expressway S7)
 Góra Kalwaria (road 79) – bypass under construction
 Kołbiel (road 17) – planned bypass
 Stojadła (road 92) – bypass
 Mińsk Mazowiecki (motorway A2) – bypass
 Łochów (road 62)
 Ostrów Mazowiecka (expressway S8)

Axle load limit 
National road 50 has an axle limit restrictions:

Between Płońsk and Mińsk Mazowiecki the allowed axle limit is up to 11.5 tons, which is a standard limit on Polish national roads.

References 

50